Normanville is a commune in the Seine-Maritime department in the Normandy region in north-western France.

Geography

Heraldry

Population

Places of interest
 The church of Sts. Ouen et Barthélemy, dating from the thirteenth century.
 A fifteenth century manorhouse at Mesnil Lieubourg

In Literature
 In Moose: Chapters From My Life (the 2013, posthumously published autobiography of Academy Award winning songwriter, Robert B. Sherman) World War II Normanville provides the central backdrop to the author's narrative.

See also
Communes of the Seine-Maritime department

References

Communes of Seine-Maritime